Microtabanus is a genus of horse flies in the family Tabanidae. There is at least one described species in Microtabanus, M. pygmaeus.

References

Tabanidae
Brachycera genera
Diptera of North America
Taxa named by Graham Fairchild